The Yulan Expressway, also known as the Yulin-Lantian Expressway, or G6521, is an expressway travelling from Yulin to Lantian County in Xi'an. It runs parallel to the G65 Baotou-Maoming Expressway.

History 
On September 29, 2012, the first portion of the expressway, in Suide County, was opened to traffic. On January 19, 2020, the portion between Baishui County and Pucheng County in Weinan was opened to traffic. The Yulan Expressway was fully completed on July 4, 2021, when the section from Yanchang County to Huanglong County was completed, reducing travel time from the two counties from 4 hours to 2 hours.

References 

Expressways in Shaanxi
Transport in Shaanxi